Zeki Çeler (born 4 March 1981) is a Turkish Cypriot politician. He was born in Kyrenia, Northern Cyprus. He was the youngest Turkish Cypriot member of the parliament of TRNC in 2013 . He represents the Girne District and is a member of the Communal Democracy Party.

2013 Parliamentary Elections in the TRNC 
At the parliamentary elections which were held on 28 July 2013, Zeki Çeler became the youngest member of parliament in the TRNC.

References

Living people
Members of the Assembly of the Republic (Northern Cyprus)
Communal Democracy Party politicians
1981 births
People from Kyrenia